Putinci railway station is a railway station on Belgrade–Šid railway. Located in Putinci, Ruma, Serbia. Railroad continued to Ruma in one and the other direction to Golubinci.  Putinci railway station consists of 5 railway track.

See also 
 Serbian Railways

References 

Ruma
Railway stations in Vojvodina